Argentina competed at the 2011 Pan American Games in Guadalajara, Mexico from October 14 to 30, 2011.

Medalists

|align="left" valign="top"|

|align="left" valign="top"|

Archery

Argentina qualified a team of four athletes, one male and three female.

Athletics

Men

Track and road events

Field events

Combined events

Women

Track and road events

Field events

Combined events

Badminton

One female and one male Argentine athletes qualified for the badminton tournament.

Basketball

Both the men's and women's teams of Argentina qualified for the basketball tournament.

Men

Alejandro Alloatti
Luis Cequeira
Marcos Delía
Pablo Espinoza
Juan Fernández Chávez
Juan Fernández
Miguel Gerlero
Luciano González
Nicolas Laprovíttola
Marcos Mata
Nicolás Romano
Matías Sandes

The Argentine Men's team competed in group A.

Seventh place match

Women

Agostina Burani
Diana Cabrera
Marina Cava
Nadia Flores
Melisa Gretter
Melisa Pavicich
Sandra Pavón
Natacha Pérez
Paula Reggiardo
Rocío Rojas
Ornella Santana
Melani Soriani

The Argentine Women's team competed in Group A.

Fifth place match

Basque pelota

Eighteen athletes representing Argentina participated at the 2011 Pan American Games in Basque pelota competitions.

Men

Women

Beach volleyball

Argentina qualified one pair of athletes each for the men's and women's tournaments.

Boxing

Seven athletes representing Argentina qualified to the 2011 Pan American Games to participate in the boxing competitions.

Men

Women

Canoeing

Eight boats represented Argentina at the canoeing competition of the 2011 Pan American Games.

Men

Women

Cycling

Road cycling

Men

Women

Track cycling

Sprints and pursuit

Keirin

Omnium

Mountain Biking

Argentina qualified three athletes, two male and one female, to compete in the mountain biking cycling competition.

Men

Women

BMX
Argentina qualified four athletes, two male and female, to compete in the BMX competition.

Equestrian

Eventing

Jumping

Individual

Team

Fencing

Thirteen Argentine athletes participated at the 2011 Pan American Games in different fencing categories.

Men

Women

Field hockey

Men

Tomás Argento
Ignacio Bergner
Federico Bermejillo
Manuel Brunet
Lucas Cammareri
Pedro Ibarra
Juan Martín López
Agustín Mazzilli
Matías Paredes
Lucas Rey
Lucas Rossi
Lucas Vila
Matías Vila
Rodrigo Vila
Juan Manuel Vivaldi
Fernando Zylberberg

The Argentine men's team competed in Pool B.

Semi-finals

Gold medal Match

Women

Laura Aladro
Luciana Aymar
Noel Barrionuevo
Silvina D'Elia
Soledad García
Rosario Luchetti
Sofía Maccari
Delfina Merino
Carla Rebecchi
Macarena Rodríguez
Rocío Sánchez Moccia
Mariela Scarone
Daniela Sruoga
María Josefina Sruoga
Belén Succi
Victoria Zuloaga

The Argentine women's team competed in Pool A.

Semi-finals

Gold medal Match

Football

Men

David Achucarro
Esteban Andrada
Sergio Araujo
Ezequiel Cirigliano
Fernando Coniglio
Leonardo Ferreyra
Franco Fragapane
Leandro González Pirez
Michael Hoyos
Lucas Kruspzky
Matías Laba
Carlos Luque
Adrián Martínez
Hugo Nervo
Germán Pezzella
Rodrigo Rey
Alan Ruíz
Lucas Villafáñez

Men's team will participate in Group B of the football tournament.

Semi-finals

Gold medal Match

Women

Analía Almeida
Estefanía Banini
Gabriela Barrios
Agustina Barroso
María Gimena Blanco
Gabriela Chávez
Noelia Espíndola
Marisa Farina
Delfina Fernández
Emilia Mendieta
Elisabeth Minnig
Andrea Ojeda
Laurina Oliveros
Mercedes Pereyra
Belén Potassa
María Quiñones
Amancay Urbani
Fabiana Vallejos

The women's team will participate in Group B of the football tournament.

Gymnastics

Artistic gymnastics

Six male athletes and three female athletes competed at the 2011 Pan American Games.

Men

Individual qualification & Team Finals

Individual Finals

Women

Individual qualification & Team Finals

Individual Finals

Rhythmic gymnastics

Two Argentine athletes qualified to compete in the individual event of rhythmic gymnastics at the 2011 Pan American Games.

Individual

Handball

Men

Gonzalo Carou
Federico Fernández
Juan Pablo Fernández
Fernando García
Andrés Kogovsek
Damián Migueles
Federico Pizarro
Cristian Platti
Pablo Portela
Leonardo Facundo Querín
Matías Schulz
Diego Simonet
Sebastián Simonet
Juan Vidal
Federico Vieyra

The Argentine men's team competed in Group B.

Group B

Semi-finals

Gold medal Match

Women

María Amelia Belotti
Valeria Bianchi
María Decilio
Bibiana Ferrea
Lucía Haro
Valentina Kogan
Antonela Mena
Luciana Mendoza
Manuela Pizzo
María Romero
Noelia Sala
Luciana Salvado
Silvina Schlesinger
Solange Tagliavini
Silvana Totolo

The Argentine women's team competed in Group A.

Group A

Semi-finals

Gold medal Match

Judo

Argentina qualified eleven athletes, five male and six female athletes, to compete in all men's and women's judo competitions.

Men

Repechage Rounds

Women

Repechage Rounds

Karate

Three Argentine athletes qualified to participate at the 2011 Pan American Games, one male and two females.

Modern pentathlon

Argentina qualified two male and two female pentathletes.

Men

Women

Racquetball

Argentina qualified three male and two female racquetball players.

Men

Women

Roller skating

Argentina qualified three male and three female roller skaters.

Men

Artistic

Women

Artistic

Rowing

Men

Women

Rugby sevens

Argentina qualified a team to participate in rugby sevens. The team consisted of twelve athletes and competed in Group B.

Team

Gabriel Ascárate
Santiago Bottini
Nicolás Bruzzone
Francisco Cuneo
Gonzalo Gutiérrez Taboada
Joaquín Luccheti
Francisco Merello
Manuel Montero
Ramiro Moyano
Javier Ortega
Diego Palma
Gastón Revol

Quarter-finals

Semi-finals

Gold medal match

Sailing

Argentina qualified nine boats and sixteen athletes to compete in all tournaments.

Men

Women

Open

Shooting

Men

Women

Softball

Argentina qualified a softball team. The team was made up of seventeen athletes.

Team

María Althabe
María Angeletti
Florencia Aranda
Ana Sofía Bollea
Andrea Brito
Mariana Carrizo
Magali Frezzotti
Aldana Gómez
Natalia Jiménez
Maria Mallaviabarrena
Paula Morbelli
María Olheiser
Bárbara Perna
María Pividori
Virginia Sciuto
María Vega
Carla Villalva

Standings

Squash

Argentina qualified six athletes to compete in all tournaments, including both male and female team's competition.

Men

Women

Swimming

Men

Women

Synchronized Swimming

Argentina qualified a team and a duet to participate in the synchronized swimming competition.

Table tennis

Argentina qualified 3 table tennis players, which also conform the men's team.

Taekwondo

Argentina qualified six athletes to compete in taekwondo events.

Men

Women

Tennis

Argentina qualified a full team of six tennis players (three male and three female).

Men

Women

Mixed doubles

Triathlon

Argentina qualified three male and two female triathletes.

Men

Women

Volleyball

Argentina qualified a men's team to compete at the 2011 Pan American Games and will participate in Group A.

Men

Squad

Nicolás Bruno
Iván Castellani
Maximiliano Cavanna
Pablo Crer
Maximiliano Gauna
Mariano Giustiniano
Franco López
Hernán Pereyra
Gonzalo Quiroga
Sebastián Solé
Alejandro Toro
Nicolás Uriarte

Quarterfinals

Semi-finals

Bronze medal match

Water polo

Argentina qualified a men's and women's water polo team.

Men

Team

Fernando Arregui
Brian Carabantes
Iván Carabantes
Gonzalo Echenique
Ignacio Echenique
Ramiro Gil
Emanuel López
Andrea Maroni
Hernán Mazzini
Bruno Testa
Frano Testa
Ramiro Veich
Germán Yañez

The men's team competed in Group B.

Elimination stage

Crossover

Fifth place match

Women

Team

Mariana Cialzeta
Carla Comba
Mariela De Virgilio
Rocío De Virgilio
Laura Font
Julieta Kruger
Lea Ledoux
María López Coton
Cora Masip
Paula Melano
Gisela Pérez
Cintia Santantino
Aldana Videberrigain

The women's team competed in Group B.

Elimination stage

Crossover

Seventh place match

Water skiing

Argentina qualified five male and female athletes to compete.

Men

Women

Weightlifting

Argentina qualified two male and two female weightlifters.

Wrestling

Argentina qualified a five athletes to compete in wrestling.

Men
Freestyle

Greco-Roman

Women
Freestyle

References

Nations at the 2011 Pan American Games
P
2011